Kcsa may refer to:

 KCSA-LP, a radio station serving the San Angelo, Texas area
 KcsA potassium channel, an ion channel from the bacterium Streptomyces lividans